Alexander de Seton may refer to:

 Sir Alexander Seton (Governor of Berwick) (fl. 1311–1340), also known as Alexander de Seton, signed the Declaration of Arbroath of 1320
 Sir Alexander Seton (d. 1332), also known as Alexander de Seton, noble